Miles B. Zimmerman, Jr. (December 19, 1917 – December 17, 1989) was a Republican member of the Pennsylvania House of Representatives.

References

Republican Party members of the Pennsylvania House of Representatives
1917 births
1989 deaths
20th-century American politicians